Ertvågsøya is an island in the municipality of Aure in Møre og Romsdal county, Norway. The small islands of Rottøya and Ruøya lie to the east of the island and the islands of Solskjelsøya and Stabblandet lie to the west. The Arasvikfjorden strait runs along the south side of the island and the Gjerdevika, an arm of the Edøyfjorden passes along the north side of the island.

The island is connected to the mainland by the Mjosund Bridge and Aursund Bridge. In 2015, there were 672 residents living on the island.

See also
List of islands of Norway

References

Aure, Norway
Islands of Møre og Romsdal